RFA Grey Rover (A269) was a  small fleet tanker of the Royal Fleet Auxiliary (RFA). She was decommissioned in 2006.

Launch and commissioning
Grey Rover was launched at the Swan Hunter yard, Hebburn on Tyne, on 17 April 1969. The Lady Sponsor was Lady Parker, the wife of Vice Admiral Sir John Parker who was Flag Officer Medway. She was completed on 10 April 1970 and accepted into service three months later than planned.

Operational history

1970–1980

In July 1973, she was involved in a collision with the Canadian submarine  resulting in the need to dry dock in Govan for repairs.

1981–1990
During Operation Corporate (the Falklands War), Grey Rover was the only operational RFA tanker which remained in UK waters. She carried out replenishment at sea (RAS) trials with STUFT ships en route to the Falkland Islands in the southwest approaches to the English Channel whilst herself was based at Portland. The smallest vessel worked with was the trawler FV Farnella and the largest was the ocean liner Queen Elizabeth 2.

1991–2000
Both ships were open to the public and 53,000 visitors were received on board both ships.

Grey Rovers last refit was 15 June–27 November 1998 which extended her service life into the 21st century.

2001–2006

In November 2004, the Parliamentary Under-Secretary of State for Defence Procurement Lord Bach announced that Grey Rover would have a decommissioning date of 2007. She paid off early on 15 March 2006 and was towed to Canada Dock, Liverpool for scrapping.

References

External links 
RFA Grey Rover - Ships Nostalgia
RFA Grey Rover - Flickr

Tankers of the Royal Fleet Auxiliary
Rover-class tankers
1969 ships